The tenth season of Supernatural, an American dark fantasy television series created by Eric Kripke, premiered on October 7, 2014 on The CW, and concluded on May 20, 2015, consisting of 23 episodes. The season aired Tuesdays at 9:00 p.m. (ET), and moved to Wednesdays at 9:00 p.m. beginning March 18, 2015. This is the third season with Jeremy Carver as showrunner. The season was released on DVD and Blu-ray in region 1 on September 8, 2015. The tenth season had an average viewership of 2.02 million U.S. viewers. The season follows Sam and Dean as Dean deals with the after effects of using The First Blade and becomes a demon. The brothers try to escape the curse, dealing with a family of murderers and Cain himself.

Cast

Starring
 Jared Padalecki as Sam Winchester
 Jensen Ackles as Dean Winchester
 Misha Collins as Castiel / Jimmy Novak
 Mark A. Sheppard as Crowley

Special appearance by
 Rob Benedict as Chuck Shurley
 Jim Beaver as Bobby Singer

Guest stars

Episodes

A special titled "A Very Special Supernatural Special" aired on October 6, 2014, narrated by Rob Benedict and received 1.07 million viewers.

Production
Supernatural was renewed for a tenth season on February 12, 2014, after undergoing an 88% spike in viewership during its ninth season. Mark A. Sheppard, who had been recurring on the show since season 5 as Crowley, was promoted to series regular.

Reception
The review aggregator website Rotten Tomatoes reported a 100% approval rating for Supernaturals tenth season, with an average rating of 7.67/10 based on 8 reviews.

Notes

References

External links

Supernatural 10
2014 American television seasons
2015 American television seasons